Suzanne Cloud (born September 7, 1951) is an American jazz singer, writer, and teacher.

Biography
Born in Philadelphia, Cloud grew up in a musical family in Pennsauken Township, New Jersey. Her father played ukulele and banjo, and her mother sang. Cloud studied piano and sang in musicals while a student at Pennsauken High School. After graduating from high school, she attended nursing school at Methodist Hospital in Philadelphia. She appeared in regional productions of The Pajama Game and Bell, Book, and Candle. She received a bachelor's degree from Rutgers University–Camden and a master's and doctorate from the University of Pennsylvania.

In the mid-1970s, Cloud was hired as the lead singer for the disco band Autumn. She recorded jingles for banks, retail stores, and other businesses, including "Come Fly with Me" for the Playboy Casino in Atlantic City, New Jersey. In 1980 she concentrated more on jazz while writing with producer and arranger Richie Rome. In 1982, she began working with pianist Eddie Green, singing jazz in hotels in Philadelphia, casinos in Atlantic City, and in neighborhood jazz clubs. Encounter Records released her debut album, I Like It, in 1986.

Cloud has been the director of the Philadelphia Jazz Legacy Project, an archival initiative, and was the founding executive director of Jazz Bridge, an organization incorporated in 2005 with a friend, jazz singer Wendy Simon, to help local jazz and blues musicians in crisis. She began Last Call at the Downbeat for PIFA 2016 with a new composition by saxophonist Bobby Zankel and his Warriors of the Wonderful Sound jazz orchestra with the students of Grover Washington Jr. Middle School, which was performed at the Kimmel Center.

Cloud is the editor of The Real Philadelphia Book, 2nd edition with over 300 jazz and blues compositions by Philadelphia musicians. She wrote a musical about Dizzy Gillespie's early years in Philadelphia for the Philadelphia International Festival of the Arts in 2014.

Awards and honors
 Named a Creative Connector by the Philadelphia Leadership Council in 2012 and featured by WHYY-FM
 Received a grant in 2016 from The Pew Center for Arts & Heritage to present the Philadelphia Real Book Concerts: New Music in Jazz and Blues, This series of concerts helped stimulate city's jazz community and expanded the Jazz Bridge Neighborhood Concerts established by Cloud in Collingswood, New Jersey in 2004.
 Named a Philadelphia Jazz Hero, Jazz Journalists Association, 2019

Discography

As leader
 I Like It (Encounter, 1986)
 With a Little Help from My Friends (Dreambox Media, 1996)
 Looking Back (Dreambox Media, 2001)

As guest
 Denis DiBlasio, Reflections of Childhood (Dreambox Media, 1997)
 Denis DiBlasio, Rhino (Dreambox Media, 2000)
 Jim Miller, If It's Not One Thing... (Dreambox Media, 2004)

References

External links
 Children of the Earle Theatre: The Philadelphia Jazz Community and the Jazz Aesthetic Cloud's dissertation

1951 births
Living people
Musicians from New Jersey
Pennsauken High School alumni
People from Pennsauken Township, New Jersey
Rutgers University alumni
University of Pennsylvania alumni